The Iowa State Bar Association is a voluntary bar association for the state of Iowa.

History
In May, 1874. Iowa lawyers met at the Polk County courthouse to organize The Iowa State Bar Association; it is the oldest voluntary state bar association in the United States.

Organization
The Association's overall governance by a 43-member Board of Governors, elected from the state’s fourteen judicial election districts. A President, President-Elect and Vice-President, are nominated by the Board and elected by the membership.

Functions
Prior to 1995, the Association policed the Bar for ethical rules violations and non-lawyers engaged in the unauthorized practice of law. In 1995, both of those functions were ceded to the Iowa Supreme Court.

The Association currently provides a broad array of services to its membership and the public.

References

See also
 Official Website

American state bar associations
Iowa law
Organizations based in Iowa
1874 establishments in Iowa
Organizations established in 1874
Organizations based in Des Moines, Iowa